Gardar Eide Einarsson (born January 12, 1976) is a Norwegian-born artist who lives and works in Tokyo and New York City. His work encompasses installation, printmaking, painting and sculpture.

Education 

Einar Granum School of Fine Art, Oslo, 1994–1996
National Academy of Fine Art, Bergen, 1996-2000
Staatliche Hochschule fur Fine Arts - Städelschule, Frankfurt am Main, 1999–2000
Whitney Museum of American Art Independent Study Program, Studio Program, New York, 2001–2002
Cooper Union School of Architecture, Architecture and Urban Studies Program, New York, 2002–2003
Whitney Museum of American Art Independent Study Program, 2002–2003

Public collections
Astrup Fearnley Museum of Modern Art, Oslo, Norway
Berkeley Art Museum, Berkeley
Los Angeles County Museum of Art
Malmo Art Museum, Malmo
Moderna Museet, Stockholm
Museum of Contemporary Art, Los Angeles
Museum of Modern Art, New York
Norwegian National Museum of Art, Oslo, Norway 
Museum für Moderne Kunst, Frankfurt Am Main, Germany

Exhibitions

Solo exhibitions
Flagwaste, TEAM, New York City, New York, 2018
Rawhide Down, Standard Oslo, Oslo, Norway, 2018 
"SHTF", Team Gallery, Venice, CA, USA, 2016
"Distinct Functionation Layers Establish Hierarchy and Order", Galleri Nils Staerk, Copenhagen, DK, 2016
"FREEDOM, MOTHERFUCKER. DO YOU SPEAK IT?", Team Gallery, New York City, USA, 2015
"A Madman, a Patient, a Condemned Man, a Worker or a Schoolboy", ARoS Aarhus Art Museum, Aarhus, Denmark, 2015
"Motivation: A Study of Action", Standard Oslo, Oslo, Norway, 2014
"He likes the fiestas. He likes the music. He likes to dance.", Maureen Paley gallery, London, UK, 2014
"Sorry If I Got It Wrong, But Something Definitely Isn't Right", Team Gallery, New York City, USA, 2012
"In The Dust of This Planet", Maureen Paley gallery, London, UK, 2012
"Art | 42 | Basel | Unlimited", June 2011, Basel, Switzerland, 2011
"Another Modern Moment Completed", Team Gallery, New York City, USA, 2010
"Judge", Team Gallery, New York City, USA, 2007
"Art | 37 | Basel | Statements", Basel, Switzerland, 2006
"leashed or confined", Team Gallery, New York City, USA, 2005

Special projects
Versuchsstation des Weltuntergangs, Bergen Kunsthall, 2013
Power Has a Fragrance, Kunsthalle Fridericianum, Kassel, 2011
Power Has a Fragrance, Reykjavik Art Museum, 2011
Whitney Biennial, Whitney Museum of American Art, New York, 2008
South of Heaven, Frankfurter Kunstverein, Frankfurt (Germany), 2007

Residencies
IASPIS, Stockholm, Sweden, 2004
Künstlerhaus Bethanien, Berlin, Germany, 2002–03
NIFCA Nordic Institute for Contemporary Art, Suomenlinna, Helsinki, Finland, 2001

Solo publications
Conservator's Notes, At Last Books, Copenhagen, Denmark, 2018
The Mess, Karma, New York, USA, 2014
Stainless Steel/ Fluorescent Pink, Rathole Books, Tokyo, Japan, 2014
Gardar Eide Einarsson, Versuchsstation Des Weltuntergangs, Bergan Kunsthall, and Sternberg Press, Norway, 2013
Power Has a Fragrance, Astrup Fearnley Museum of Modern Art, Norway, 2011
South of Heaven,  Revolver, Frankfurt am Main, Germany, 2007

Catalogues
Kvaran, Gunnar; Ueland, Hanne Beate and Årbu, Grete (ed.): Lights On!, Astrup Fearnley Museum of Modern Art / Skira, Oslo, 2008
Huldisch, Henriette and Momin, Shamim M.: The Whitney Biennial, Whitney Museum of American Art, New York, USA, 2008
Einarsson, Gardar Eide and Keller, Christoph: South of Heaven, Revolver Verlag, Frankfurt am Main, Germany, 2007
Einarsson, Gardar Eide and Keller, Christoph: Long Haired and Freaky People Need Not Apply, Revolver Verlag, Frankfurt am Main, Germany, 2004
Art For the People, Riksutstillinger, Bergen Kunsthall a.o, Norway, 2003
CMYK/Greyscale, Tramway, Glasgow, Scotland, 2002
Strike, Wolverhampton Art Gallery, Wolverhampton, UK, 2002
Esplanaden, Charlottenborg Exhibition Hall, Copenhagen, Denmark, 2002
Audit, Casino Luxembourg Forum d’ Art Contemporain, Luxembourg, 2001
Kosmos, Rooseum Center for Contemporary Art, Malmö, Sweden, 2001
Osculum Infame, Nordic Institute for Contemporary Art, Helsinki, Iceland, 2001
Schpaa, Bergen Kunstforening/ Bergen Kunsthall/ Den Frie Udstilling, Copenhagen/
Bergen, Denmark/Norway, 2001
Festival Junge Talente, Offenbach am Main, Germany, 2000
Momentum- Nordic Festival for Contemporary Art, Moss, Norway, 2000

Published work
Bunch of Motherfuckers: Unfinished Individuation and Meshworks of Equivalence, The Vital Coincidence, Walther Koenig Verlag, Cologne, 2004
Lars Von Trier, Something is going to happen, Frotté Factory, Oslo, 2004
You Just Don’t Get it Dad, So Fuck Off, The Academy and the Corporate Public, Permanent Press Verlag, Cologne, 2004
Hardcore, Self-organization and Alternativity, We Are All Normal- Nordic Artist Writings, NIFCA, Copenhagen/ Helsinki, 2004
Oh My What A Dazzling Display, The Mock Commodity Fetishism of Klaus Thejl Jacobsen, Galleri Nicolai Wallner Notes on Asskissing & Corporate Strategies of the *RAF, Corporate Mentality, Lukas and Sternberg, New York, 2004
Total Revolution, True Lies, Pork Salad Press, Copenhagen, 2004
Rotation a NIFCA Project in Media Space, Nordic Institute for Contemporary Art/Morgenbladet, Oslo/Helsinki, 2001
Terje Nicolaisen’s Deriving Practice, Terje Nicolaisen, Tegneforbundet, Oslo, 2001
Billedkunst Magazine, regular critic and member of editorial board Publication Series for Oslo Kunsthall, editor, 2001
Metronome, Frankfurt/Main a.o., 2000
UKS Forum For Samtidskunst 1/2 2000, guest editor, 2000

References

External links
Gardar Eide Einarsson, Interview

1976 births
Living people
Norwegian artists
Norwegian expatriates in the United States